Brooke David Guest (born 14 May 1997) is an English cricketer. He made his first-class debut for Lancashire in the 2018 County Championship on 24 September 2018. He made his List A debut on 17 April 2019, for Lancashire in the 2019 Royal London One-Day Cup.  On 10 August 2020, Derbyshire announced they had signed Guest on a two year deal. He's since extended the deal by another year. He made his Twenty20 debut on 30 August 2020, for Derbyshire in the 2020 t20 Blast. In September 2021, in the 2021 County Championship, Guest scored his maiden century in first-class cricket.

References

External links
 

1997 births
Living people
English cricketers
Lancashire cricketers
Derbyshire cricketers
Cricketers from Manchester